Saint Simplicius of Vienne, otherwise Simplides, was a bishop of Vienne  in the Dauphiné, France, from around the end of the fourth century and the beginning of the fifth century. He is venerated as a saint of the Catholic Church.

Simplicius apparently attended the Council of Turin which probably took place in either 398 or 400.
Gregory of Tours cites a lost letter of Paulinus of Nola (died 431) as having praised Simplicius, considering him "one of the most worthy bishops of his time". 

His feast day is celebrated on 11 February.

References

Further reading 
André Pelletier, Vienna, Vienne, Presses universitaires de Lyon, coll. "Galliæ civitates", 2001, pp. 161–162
Gérard Lucas, Vienne dans les textes grecs et latins: Chroniques littéraires sur l'histoire de la cité, des Allobroges à la fin du Ve siècle de notre ère, MOM Éditions, coll. "Travaux de la Maison de l’Orient et de la Méditerranée", 2018, pp. 247–270: Adon de Vienne, Chronique, principally the "Tableau récapitulatif de la liste des évêques de Vienne jusqu'à Avit" (online version)
 Ulysse Chevalier, Notice chronologico-historique sur les archevêques de Vienne: d'après des documents paléographiques inédits, Vienne, 1879, p. 9 (online version)

Bishops of Vienne
3rd-century births
4th-century deaths
Year of birth unknown
Year of death unknown
Gallo-Roman saints
4th-century Christian saints